Common fox may refer to:

Crab-eating fox
Red fox

Animal common name disambiguation pages